Irina Laricheva may refer to:

Irina Laricheva (shooter) (1964–2020), Soviet and Russian trap shooter
Irina Laricheva (swimmer) (born 1963), Soviet swimmer